Gavrilovka is a rural locality (a village) in Irtyubaksky Selsoviet, Kugarchinsky District, Bashkortostan, Russia. The population was 76 as of 2010. There are 2 streets.

Geography 
Gavrilovka is located 21 km north of Mrakovo (the district's administrative centre) by road. Tyulebayevo is the nearest rural locality.

References 

Rural localities in Kugarchinsky District